Lesticus thetis is a species of ground beetle in the subfamily Pterostichinae. It was described by Kirschenhofer in 1997.

References

Lesticus
Beetles described in 1997